Ulla Andersson (born 1963) is a Swedish politician of the Left Party. She has been a member of the Riksdag since 2006.

External links 
Ulla Andersson at the Riksdag website

Members of the Riksdag from the Left Party (Sweden)
Living people
1963 births
Women members of the Riksdag
21st-century Swedish women politicians
Members of the Riksdag 2006–2010
Members of the Riksdag 2010–2014
Members of the Riksdag 2014–2018
Members of the Riksdag 2018–2022